Gigi Fernández and Natasha Zvereva were the defending champions but lost in the semifinals to Arantxa Sánchez Vicario and Helena Suková. With this loss, they missed out on the 1993 Calendar Grand Slam in Women's Doubles.

Sánchez Vicario and Suková won in the final 6–4, 6–2 against Amanda Coetzer and Inés Gorrochategui.

Seeds 
Champion seeds are indicated in bold text while text in italics indicates the round in which those seeds were eliminated.

Draw

Finals

Top half

Section 1

Section 2

Bottom half

Section 3

Section 4

External links 
1993 US Open – Women's draws and results at the International Tennis Federation

Women's Doubles
US Open (tennis) by year – Women's doubles
1993 in women's tennis
1993 in American women's sports